Marjorie Weinman Sharmat (November 12, 1928 – March 12, 2019) was an American children's writer.
She wrote more than 130 books for children and teens and her books have been translated into several languages. They have won awards including Book of the Year by the Library of Congress or have become selections by the Literary Guild.

Perhaps Sharmat's most popular work features the child detective Nate the Great. He was inspired by and named after her father, who lived to see the first Nate book published. One story, Nate the Great Goes Undercover, was adapted as a made-for-TV movie that won the Los Angeles International Children's Film Festival Award. 
Sharmat's husband Mitchell Sharmat expanded Nate's storyline by creating Olivia Sharp, his cousin and fellow detective. Husband and wife wrote four Olivia Sharp books published 1989 to 1991. During the 1990s, their son Craig Sharmat (then in his thirties) wrote three Nate books with his mother. In the late 2010s, their other son Andrew co-wrote the last two Nate books written while Marjorie Weinman Sharmat was alive. With Marjorie Weinman Sharmat's  passing in 2019 Andrew has continued writing the series with Nate the Great and the Earth Day Robot (2021).  

In the mid-1980s Sharmat wrote three books published in 1984 and 1985 under the pseudonym Wendy Andrews (below).

Sharmat also wrote the Sorority Sisters series, eight short novels published in 1986 and 1987 (not listed below). They are romantic fiction with a sense of humor. They are set in a California public high school (day school for ages 14 to 18, approximately).

Life
Sharmat, who was born in Portland, Maine, on November 12, 1928, graduated from Westbrook Junior College in 1948. Sharmat's parents were Nathan and Anna Richardson Weinman. Nathan Weinman was a dry goods manufacturer and dealer. She had one sister, Rosalind.

Sharmat died on March 12, 2019, at the age of 90.

Works 
Many of Sharmat's publications belong to one of the series (below) Nate the Great (from 1972), Morris Brookside (1973–1974), Olivia Sharp (1989–1991), or Duz Shedd (1993–2000). 
 Rex (Harper & Row, 1967), picture book illustrated by Emily McCully (this list otherwise mixes picture books and longer works without comment)
 Goodnight, Andrew; Goodnight Craig (Harper, 1969), illus. Mary Chalmers – named after sons Andrew Sharmat and Craig Sharmat
 Gladys Told Me to Meet Her Here (Harper, 1970), illus. Edward Frascino
 A Visit with Rosalind (Macmillan, 1971), illus. Lisl Weil – named after sister Rosalind Weinman
 51 Sycamore Lane (Macmillan, 1971), illus. Lisl Weil
 A Hot Thirsty Day (Macmillan, 1971), illus. Rosemary Wells
 Getting Something on Maggie Marmelstein (Harper, 1971), illus. Ben Shecter
 Sophie and Gussie, 1973
 I Want Mama, 1974 (illus. Emily Arnold McCully); German edition, Mama liegt im Krankenhaus (Carlsen, 1976)
 Walter the Wolf, 1975 (illus. Kelly Oechsli)
 Mooch the Messy, 1976 (illus. Ben Shecter)
 I'm Terrific, 1977 (illus. Kay Chorao)
 Mitchell Is Moving, 1978
 A Big Fat Enormous Lie, 1978
 Thornton, the Worrier, 1978
 Mooch the Messy Meets Prudence the Neat, 1978
 Mr. Jameson & Mr. Phillips, 1979
 Uncle Boris and Maude, 1979
 I Am Not a Pest, 1979
 Griselda's New Year, 1979
 Octavia Told Me a Secret, 1979
 Say Hello, Vanessa, 1979 (illus. Lillian Hoban)
 Scarlet Monster Lives Here, 1979 (illus. Dennis Kendrick)
 The Trolls of Twelfth Street, 1979
 Sasha the Silly, 1979
 The 329th Friend, 1979
 The Day I was Born, 1980
 Gila Monsters Meet you at the Airport, 1980 (illus. by Byron Barton)
 Griselda's New Year, 1980 (illus. Normand Chartier)
 Grumley the Grouch, 1980 (illus. Kay Chorao)
 Sometimes Mama and Papa Fight, 1980 (illus. Kay Chorao)
 What Are we Going to do About Andrew?, 1980
 Lucretia the Unbearable, 1981
 Rollo and Juliet, 1981
 Twitchell the Wishful, 1981
 Chasing After Annie, 1981
 Little Devil Gets Sick, 1982 (illus. Marylin Hafner)
 Two Ghosts on a Bench, 1982
 How to Meet a Gorgeous Guy, 1983
 I Saw Him First (Delacorte Press, 1983) – romantic fiction for teens
 The Seven Sloppy Days of Phineas Pig, 1983 (illus. Sue Truesdell)
 Rich Mitch, 1983
 How to Meet a Gorgeous Girl, 1984
 He Noticed I'm Alive – and Other Hopeful Signs, 1984
 My Mother Never Listens to Me 1984 (illus. Lynn Munsinger)
 Supergirl Storybook: Based on the Motion Picture Supergirl, G. P. Putnam, 1984 (as Wendy Andrews)
 Vacation Fever!, Pacer Books, 1984 (as Wendy Andrews)
 Are We There Yet?, Pacer Books, 1985 (as Wendy Andrews)
 One Terrific Thanksgiving, 1985
 Two Guys Noticed Me – and Other Miracles, 1985
 Get Rich Mitch, 1985
 Hooray for Mother's Day!, 1986
 Hooray for Father's Day!, 1987
 I'm the Best, 1991 (illus. Will Hillenbrand)

Morris Brookside
Illustrated by Ronald Himler:
 Morris Brookside, a Dog, 1973
 Morris Brookside is Missing 1974

Duz Shedd, or Genghis Kahn
Illustrated by Mitchell Rigie:
 Hollywood Hound: A Duz Shedd Story (AKA The Great Genghis Khan Look-Alike Contest), 1993
 A Dog Star is Born: A Duz Shedd Story (AKA Genghis Kahn: A Dog Star is Born) 1994
 Dog-Gone Hollywood: A Duz Shedd Story (AKA Genghis Kahn: Dog-Gone Hollywood) 1994
 Dirty Tricks: A Duz Shedd Story, 2000

Nate the Great
Illustrated primarily by Marc Simont, later by Martha Weston (as chapter books), recently by Jody Wheeler (also as chapter books):
 Nate the Great, 1972
 Nate the Great Goes Undercover, 1974
 Nate the Great and the Lost List, 1975
 Nate the Great and the Phony Clue, 1977
 Nate the Great and the Sticky Case, 1978
 Nate the Great and the Missing Key, 1981
 Nate the Great and the Snowy Trail, 1983
 Nate the Great and the Fishy Prize, 1985
 Nate the Great Stalks Stupidweed, 1986
 Nate the Great and the Boring Beach Bag, 1987
 Nate the Great Goes Down in the Dumps, 1989
 Nate the Great and the Halloween Hunt, 1989
 Nate the Great and the Musical Note, 1990 (written with son Craig Sharmat)
 Nate the Great and the Stolen Base, 1992
 Nate the Great and the Pillowcase, 1993 (with sister Rosalind Weinman)
 Nate the Great and the Mushy Valentine, 1994
 Nate the Great and the Tardy Tortoise, 1995 (with Craig Sharmat)
 Nate the Great and the Crunchy Christmas, 1996 (with Craig Sharmat)
 Nate the Great Saves the King of Sweden, 1997
 Nate the Great and Me: The Case of the Fleeing Fang, 1998
 Nate the Great and the Monster Mess, 1999
 Nate the Great, San Francisco Detective, 2000 (written with husband Mitchell Sharmat)
 Nate the Great and the Big Sniff, 2001 (with Mitchell Sharmat)
 Nate the Great on the Owl Express, 2003
 Nate the Great Talks Turkey, 2006  (with Mitchell Sharmat; illus. Jody Wheeler)
 Nate the Great and the Hungry Book Club, 2009 (with Mitchell Sharmat; illus. Jody Wheeler)
 Nate the Great, Where Are You?, 2015 (with Mitchell Sharmat,  illus. Jody Wheeler)
 Nate the Great and the Missing Birthday Snake, 2018 (with son Andrew Sharmat,  illus. Jody Wheeler)
 Nate the Great and the Wandering Word, 2019 (with son Andrew Sharmat,  illus. Jody Wheeler)

Olivia Sharp
Featuring Nate the Great's cousin, Olivia Sharp, "Agent for Secrets". Co-written with husband Mitchell Sharmat and illustrated by Denise Brunkus:
 The Pizza Monster, 1989
 Princess of the Filmore Street School, 1989
 The Sly Spy, 1990
 The Green Toenails Gang, 1991
 Akulakhan, 2002

References

External links 
 
 Nate the Great at publisher Random House
 Maine Writers Index: S at Waterboro Public Library, Maine (archived 2006-05-03) 
 Picture Books Author of the Month (November 2000?) at Greenville Public Library, Rhode Island
 Sharmat at Aga-search.com (Japanese language)
 
  
  
 

1928 births
2019 deaths
American children's writers
American romantic fiction writers
Writers from Portland, Maine
American women children's writers
Westbrook College alumni
Women romantic fiction writers
21st-century American women